Spit Point is the east tip of the  long Elephant Spit, a conspicuous spit at the eastern end of Heard Island. The feature was charted by early American sealers at Heard Island in the years following initiation of sealing operations there in 1855. The descriptive name was apparently given some years later and is now established in usage.
 

Headlands of Heard Island and McDonald Islands